Fresna nyassae, also known as the variegated Acraea skipper or variegated Acraea hopper, is a species of butterfly in the family Hesperiidae. It is found from Ghana and Kenya to South Africa.

The wingspan is 34–38 mm for males and 39–42 mm for females. The underside is pale purple or yellowish, with black spots. Adults are on wing year-round, but are commonest in spring and summer.

The larvae feed on Albizia species, Julbernardia globiflora and Paullinia pinnata. First instar larvae are bright scarlet with a black head. Later instars are whitish with a brown head. The final instar is smooth and white with a broken black dorsal stripe and a reddish-brown head with symmetrical orange markings.

References

Butterflies described in 1878
Astictopterini
Butterflies of Africa
Taxa named by William Chapman Hewitson